The 2022–23 season is the 120th season in the history of U.S. Cremonese and the club's first season back in the top flight since 1996. The club are participating in Serie A and the Coppa Italia.

Players

Current squad

Out on loan
.

Pre-season and friendlies

Competitions

Overall record

Serie A

League table

Results summary

Results by round

Matches 
The league fixtures were announced on 24 June 2022.

Coppa Italia

References

U.S. Cremonese seasons
Cremonese